Ranald is a name.

Ranald may also refer to:

4248 Ranald, asteroid
Clan Ranald
SS Clan Ranald (1900), ship wrecked off Australia

See also